Christian Rémi Richard (born 1941) is a former politician and diplomat in Madagascar. Richard was foreign minister under President Admiral Didier Ratsiraka from 1977 to 1983.

References

External links
 Interview with Richard in July 1979 by the PLO News Bulletin

1941 births
Malagasy diplomats
Malagasy politicians
Living people
Foreign Ministers of Madagascar